Ryan Flynn may refer to:

Ryan Flynn (footballer) (born 1988), Scottish footballer
Ryan Flynn (ice hockey) (born 1988), American ice hockey player
Ryan Flynn, fictional character in the 2004 film The Dust Factory